Egosoft GmbH (formerly Ego Software) is a German video game developer based in Würselen, Germany. The company was founded by Bernd Lehahn in 1988.

Egosoft is best known for its X series of video games, a series of space simulator games noted for combining open-ended gameplay, dynamic market-driven economy and compelling storyline. The series began in 1999 with X: Beyond the Frontier. Since then, the series has expanded with three sequels and three standalone expansions; the latest being X4: Foundations, released 30 November 2018.

History 
Egosoft was founded in Würselen by Bernd Lehahn in 1988, making it the oldest active video game company in Germany. Its first game, Hotel Detective, was released for the Amiga in June 1988.

In 2000, Egosoft planned a multiplayer online game called Online Universe or X Online. This project was intended to be "the next step in the evolution of Egosoft's X universe." Egosoft has since released a number of games, yet has given little indication of the progress of this project. In 2003, Egosoft staff were working on a later version—codenamed X2OL—which Egosoft chief executive officer Bernd Lehahn described as their "long-term goal." There is still no official information on the Online Universe, though there has been speculation that X2 and X3's 2007 uplink feature may be a positive spin-off of the project.

In late 2009, Egosoft announced that Terran Conflict completed the story started in X: Beyond the Frontier, taken by some to mean the end of the franchise. However, in March 2011 they announced on their X-Universe forums that they would be attending FedCon XX in Düsseldorf on 28 April 2011, and would show preview footage of their current project, previously only referred to by the codename TNBT (The Next Big Thing). However, on 20 April 2011, they released a trailer officially announcing X Rebirth, initially slated for a Q4 2011 release. X Rebirth will take place in the X Universe after a major catastrophe (the shutdown of the series' network of jump gates, thus starting a new chapter in the X Universe separate from the original plot line. Rebirth missed its first two proposed release dates (Q4 2011 and 2012) and was eventually released 15 November 2013.

Games developed

References

External links 
 

Video game companies of Germany
Video game development companies